Paulo Retre is an Australian professional football (soccer) player who plays as a midfielder for Sydney FC in the A-League.

Early life

His father, Carlos, played in the Australian National Soccer League (NSL) for Footscray JUST.

Career

Retre was introduced to the A-League system by Melbourne Victory, as member of the youth team and appearing for the senior team in a friendly against LA Galaxy before switching to rivals Melbourne Heart. On 19 December 2015, Retre scored his first ever goal against Melbourne Victory, in a 2–1 win in the Melbourne Derby. On 16 June 2017, Retre was released by Melbourne City.

On 22 June 2017, A-League champions Sydney FC signed Retre for 2 years. Retre scored his first goal for Sydney FC in Round 3 of the 2018–19 A-League season, against former club Melbourne City. He also scored one of the few own goals in the 2018-2019 A League season.

Honours
Sydney FC
A-League Championship: 2018–19, 2019–20
A-League Premiership: 2017–2018, 2019–20
FFA Cup: 2017

References

External links

1993 births
Living people
Australian soccer players
Australia under-20 international soccer players
Association football midfielders
Melbourne Victory FC players
Melbourne City FC players
Sydney FC players
A-League Men players
Australian people of Portuguese descent
Soccer players from Melbourne